The 9th Infantry Division was a military formation of the Korean People's Army during the 20th Century.

Was part of the North Korean advance from Seoul to Taejon.

Fought in the Battle of Pusan Perimeter.

References

InfDiv0009
InfDiv0009NK